James Arthur Boyd (7 July 1867 – 12 April 1941) was an Australian politician. Born in Portsea, Hampshire, his family moved to Ayrshire in Scotland around 1869, where he was educated at St John's Academy in Glasgow before becoming an apprentice painter. He migrated to Melbourne, Victoria, in 1885, where he had many occupations, including councillor on Port Melbourne Council.

In 1901 he was elected to the Victorian Legislative Assembly for the seat of Melbourne as a Conservative. He was an Honorary Minister 1907–08. In 1908 he left the Assembly, and in 1913 he was elected to the Australian House of Representatives as the Liberal member for the new seat of Henty. In 1917 the Liberal Party merged with the National Labor Party to become the Nationalist Party, of which Boyd was a member. He held the seat until 1919, when he was defeated by independent Nationalist Frederick Francis, despite having almost double Francis's primary vote. He became a businessman after leaving politics, and was President of the Melbourne Chamber of Commerce 1920–1922 and of the Associated Chambers of Australia 1922–1923.

Boyd married Emma Flora McCormack on 5 January 1894 at Flemington. They had two daughters, Alva who became a medical practitioner, and Esna who became an Australian tennis champion. Boyd died of coronary vascular disease on 12 April 1941.

References

Commonwealth Liberal Party members of the Parliament of Australia
Nationalist Party of Australia members of the Parliament of Australia
Members of the Australian House of Representatives for Henty
Members of the Australian House of Representatives
Victoria (Australia) state politicians
1867 births
1941 deaths
20th-century Australian politicians
Scottish emigrants to colonial Australia
People from Ayrshire
People from Portsea, Portsmouth